Scott Henderson (born August 26, 1954) is an American jazz fusion and blues guitarist best known for his work with the band Tribal Tech.

Tribal Tech
Henderson formed Tribal Tech with bass player Gary Willis in 1984. Under the direction of Henderson and Willis, Tribal Tech became one of the most highly regarded fusion bands of the 1980s.  During the band's initial run until their dissolution following the 2000 album Rocket Science, Henderson brought himself to the forefront of modern jazz/fusion guitar playing. In 1991 he was named '#1 Jazz Guitarist' by Guitar World magazine, and in January 1992 he was voted best jazz guitarist in Guitar Player magazine's Annual Reader's Poll.

Tribal Tech reunited and released an album entitled X in 2011, but in June 2014, Henderson posted on his message board that the band would again be dissolving.

Other work
Since 1984, Henderson has taught at the Guitar Institute of Technology, which is part of the Musicians Institute in Hollywood, California.

Discography

As leader Tribal Tech
 Spears (1985)
 Dr. Hee (1987)
 Nomad (1990)
 Tribal Tech (1991)
 Illicit (1992)
 Face First (1993)
 Reality Check (1995)
 Thick (1999)
 Rocket Science (2000)
 X (2012)

Solo albums
 Dog Party (1994)
 Tore Down House (1997)
 Well to the Bone (2002)
 Live! (2005)
 Vibe Station (2015)
 People Mover (2019)

As Vital Tech Tones - with Steve Smith and Victor Wooten  
 Vital Tech Tones (Tone Center, 1998)
 VTT2 (Tone Center, 2000)

As HBC - with Jeff Berlin and Dennis Chambers
 HBC (2012)

As sideman
 Steve Bailey, Dichotomy (Victor, 1992)
 Gregg Bissonette, Gregg Bissonette (Mascot, 1998)
 Gregg Bissonette, Siblings Dogs in Space Music (BMI, 1992)
 Jeff Berlin, Champion (Passport, 1985)
 Tom Coster, The Forbidden Zone (JVC, 1994)
 Sandeep Chowta, Matters of the Heart (Sony, 2013)
 Billy Childs, I've Known Rivers (Stretch, 1995)
 Carl Verheyen, Trading 8s (Cranktone, 2009)
 Chick Corea, The Chick Corea Elektric Band (GRP, 1986)
 Dennis Chambers, Groove and More (Soul Trade, 2013)
 Gerald Gradwohl, Tritone Barrier (ESC, 2007)
 Virgil Donati, Just Add Water (Thunder Drum, 1997)
 Jean-Luc Ponty, Fables (Atlantic, 1985)
 Scott Kinsey, Kinesthetics (Abstract Logix, 2006)
 Bernie Williams, Moving Forward (Reform, 2009)
 Joe Zawinul, Vienna Nights/Live at Joe Zawinul's Birdland (BHM, 2005)
 Joe Zawinul, The Immigrants (CBS, 1988)
 Joe Zawinul, Black Water (CBS, 1989)

References

External links
 Scott Henderson's website
 1999 Scott Henderson Interview
 2015 Scott Henderson Interview on Guitar.com

20th-century American guitarists
21st-century American guitarists
American jazz guitarists
Jazz fusion guitarists
Jazz-funk guitarists
Living people
1954 births
Musicians Institute alumni
Chick Corea Elektric Band members
Tribal Tech members
The Zawinul Syndicate members
Vital Tech Tones members